Oswego Township occupies the 6-mile-square-plus additional land to the south of the Fox River in northeast corner of Kendall County, Illinois. As of the 2010 census, its population was 50,870 and it contained 17,914 housing units.

Geography

U.S. Route 30 and U.S. Route 34 run east to west through the township. IL 25, IL 31 and IL 71 also run through the township. Today, the township has become predominantly a suburb of Chicago.

Cities and towns
 Aurora (partial)
 Montgomery (partial)
 Oswego (majority)
 Plainfield (partial)

Other Communities
 Boulder Hill
 Wolfs at

Demographics

Government
The township is governed by an elected Town Board of a Supervisor and four Trustees.  The Township also has an elected Assessor, Clerk, Highway Commissioner and Supervisor.  The Township Office is located at 84 Templeton Drive, Suite 104 Oswego, IL 60543

Notes

References

External links
 

1849 establishments in Illinois
Townships in Kendall County, Illinois
Townships in Illinois